Albert Warren Ferris (December 3, 1856-4 October 1937) was an American psychiatrist, born in Brooklyn, New York.

Ferris received his A.B from the University of the City of New York, now New York University, in 1878, his A.M. in 1885 from the same institution and his M.D. from the College of Physicians and Surgeons (Columbia University) in 1882.  He married Miss Juliet A. Gavette in New York City in 1897.

His occupations were in the State of New York. In 1892 he set up practice in New York City. He was a consulting physician to the Italian Hospital, New York, and to the Binghamton State Hospital. From September 23, 1907 - December 27, 1911 he was president of the New York State Commission in Lunacy.  He was also president of the Schuyler County Medical Society, and an associate editor of the New York State Journal of Medicine.  He was also the Director of the Saratoga Springs (New York) State Reservation Commission from 1913 - 1916.

His biography in The Home Medical Library states that he was a, "Former Assistant in Neurology, Columbia University; Former Chairman, Section on Neurology and Psychiatry, New York Academy of Medicine; Assistant in Medicine, University and Bellvue Hospital Medical College; Medical Editor, New International Encyclopedia."

References

External links

 Guide to the Albert W. Ferris Papers

1856 births
1937 deaths
American psychiatrists
Columbia University Vagelos College of Physicians and Surgeons alumni
People from Brooklyn